Andrzej Stypiński (18 February 1907 – 11 March 1975) was a Polish painter. His work was part of the painting event in the art competition at the 1932 Summer Olympics.

References

1907 births
1975 deaths
20th-century Polish painters
20th-century Polish male artists
Olympic competitors in art competitions
Artists from Warsaw
Polish male painters